Mathghamhain Ó hIfearnáin, was an early modern Irish poet.

Ó hIfearnáin was living in the Shronell district of County Tipperary in the late 16th century, and wrote poems on the decline of the profession of poetry. His best-known poem, Ceist! Cia do cheinneóchadh dán?, describes his journey across Munster in search of a buyer for a well-wrought poem.

See also
Fear Flatha Ó Gnímh
Eochaidh Ó hÉoghusa

References

Ceist! cia do cheinneóchadh dán? in Irish Bardic Poetry, Ed. Osborn Bergin. Dublin, Dublin Institute for Advanced Studies (1970) page 145-146

16th-century Irish writers
Irish-language poets
Irish poets
People from County Tipperary
People of Elizabethan Ireland